Louis Fauconnier (born 3 October 1915, date of death unknown) was a Belgian modern pentathlete. He competed at the 1948 Summer Olympics.

References

1915 births
Year of death missing
Belgian male modern pentathletes
Olympic modern pentathletes of Belgium
Modern pentathletes at the 1948 Summer Olympics